Luz Ardiden is a ski resort in the Pyrenees. It is situated in the Hautes-Pyrénées department, in the Occitanie Region. The ski resort lies at a height of 1720 meters and was opened on January 16, 1975. In recent years the road to Luz Ardiden has served as an occasional stage finish for the Tour de France and the Vuelta a España.

Details of climb
Starting from Luz-Saint-Sauveur (710 m), the climb to Luz Ardiden (1720 m) is 14.7 km long. The elevation gain over this distance is 1010 m (an average of 6.9%). The maximum gradient is 10%.

Cycling

Luz Ardiden has been the finish-line for Tour de France and Vuelta a España stages several times.

Tour de France stage finishes

During the 1985 Tour de France stage 17, which included Luz Ardiden, was the scene of an infamous moment in cycling history. On stage 17 LeMond and a rival rider, Stephen Roche, were far ahead of the pack when the team boss Bernard Tapie and coach Paul Köchli asked him to slow down, saying that Hinault was 45 seconds behind. LeMond refrained from attacking and waited at the stage's finish where he realized he'd been misled; Hinault was in fact more than three minutes behind. Hinault went on to win that year's Tour by 1 minute 42 seconds; in return for his assistance, LeMond was assured by Hinault that he would support LeMond the following year.

During the 1990 Tour Claudio Chiappucci had surprised all of the pre-race favorites by still leading the race by over two minutes going into stage 16, which ended in a mountaintop finish on Luz Ardiden. Late in the stage after the race had come back together Fabio Parra launched an attack which only LeMond and Miguel Induráin could answer. LeMond and Induráin quickly caught and dropped Parra and LeMond set the pace up the final climb. By the time they reached the summit LeMond had all but secured his 3rd Tour de France victory and sat up as Induráin claimed the stage win. This performance on Luz Ardiden all but secured the victory for LeMond, even though there were still several stages to go, because it was well known that he was a far better time trialist than Chiappucci and would easily make up the +0:05 deficit which meant, in essence, that aside from crashing out, it was now LeMond's Tour to win or lose. Even though Induráin had yet to win the first of his five Tours, this would be the final (non-ITT) victory of his career.

During the 2003 Tour de France, Lance Armstrong was riding with Iban Mayo at the start of the climb to Luz Ardiden when Armstrong crashed, bringing Mayo down with him. The fall was caused when Armstrong caught the handlebar of his bike on the strap of a spectator's bag. Jan Ulrich, who was riding just behind Armstrong and Mayo, avoided the crash, and in an act of chivalry he slowed to wait for the fallen riders. Armstrong would go on to win by his smallest ever margin.

Vuelta a España stage finishes

See also
 List of highest paved roads in Europe
 List of mountain passes

References

External links

 Official website of the Ski Resort
 Profile on climbbybike.com
 Profile of the climb 
 Luz-Ardiden  dans le Tour de France 
 Luz Ardiden on Google Maps (Tour de France classic climbs)

Ski stations in France
Tourist attractions in Hautes-Pyrénées
Sports venues in Hautes-Pyrénées